Federico Guerra Alanís (born 30 January 1983) is a Uruguayan former professional footballer who played as a forward.

Career
Guerra began his career with Fénix, making twenty appearances and netting two goals across two seasons in the Primera División. Mexican second tier team Cobras signed Guerra in 2004, with the forward appearing twelve times in Primera División A; his last match was a 1–0 defeat to Lobos BUAP on 6 November 2004. In 2007, Guerra featured for Liga Nacional side Deportivo Mictlán. He spent the rest of 2006–07 with the Guatemalans, ending with relegation. Guerra subsequently went back to Uruguay with Atenas. Six goals in twenty-one came. Guerra then had stints with Rampla Juniors and, again, Atenas between 2008 and 2010.

Career statistics
.

References

External links

1983 births
Living people
People from Florida Department
Uruguayan footballers
Association football forwards
Uruguayan expatriate footballers
Expatriate footballers in Mexico
Expatriate footballers in Guatemala
Uruguayan expatriate sportspeople in Mexico
Uruguayan expatriate sportspeople in Guatemala
Uruguayan Primera División players
Ascenso MX players
Uruguayan Segunda División players
Centro Atlético Fénix players
Club de Fútbol Cobras players
Deportivo Mictlán players
Atenas de San Carlos players
Rampla Juniors players